Vera Estelle Cathcart, Countess Cathcat (14 May 1892 – April 1993) was a South African writer and actress.

Early life
Vera Estelle Fraser was born 14 May 1892 at Cape Town, Cape Colony. She was a daughter of John Fraser of Cape Town.

Career
Following her divorce from Lord Cathcart, she wrote the play Ashes of Love which was staged in London, Washington, D.C., and New York City where she succeeded Earl Carroll as the producer of the show. In addition she wrote other plays and several novels, including The Woman Tempted.

Personal life
In September 1910, Vera married Captain Henry de Grey Warter of Cruckmeole in Shropshire, in London. Before he was killed at the Battle of the Somme in France, they were the parents of two children:

 Dolores de Gray Warter, who was engaged to Theodore Medlam in 1929; she married Gerald Holdsworth.
 Henry Grosvenor de Gray Warter (1911–1993), who married "musical comedy star" Mabel Bowers Rean in 1930.

After his death, she married George Cathcart, 5th Earl Cathcart, a younger son of Alan Cathcart, 3rd Earl Cathcart and Elizabeth Mary Crompton, on 6 January 1919 in Chelsea, London. Before their divorce on 23 February 1922, they were the parents of one son:

 Alan Cathcart, 6th Earl Cathcart (1919–1999), a Maj.-Gen. in the British Army who married Rosemary Clare Marie Gabrielle Smyth-Osbourne, daughter of A/Cdre Sir Henry Percy Smyth-Osbourne, in 1946. After her death, he married Marie Isobel French, daughter of Hon. William Joseph French (himself a son of the 4th Baron de Freyne), in 1984.

Her third marriage was to widower and shipbuilding millionaire Sir Rowland Hodge, 1st Baronet on 30 September 1930. Four years after their marriage, Lady Hodge sought a divorce from Sir Rowland but was denied by the court and jury in November 1934.

Lady Hodge died in April 1993.

References
Notes

Sources

External links
 Daughter Of Countess To Marry at Getty Images
Lady Vera Hodge Formerly Vera Estelle Dowager Countess Of Cathcart At Home. at Shutterstock

1892 births
1993 deaths
British countesses